The 2009 Virginia Cavaliers football team represented the University of Virginia in the 2009 NCAA Division I FBS football season as a member of the Coastal Division of the Atlantic Coast Conference (ACC). The Cavaliers were led by ninth-year head coach Al Groh. The previous season, Groh fired his offensive coordinator, his son Mike Groh, and replaced him with Gregg Brandon, who had himself been fired as the head coach at Bowling Green. Brandon installed the spread offense at Virginia. The Cavaliers finished the season 3–9, 2–6 in conference play and failed to qualify for a bowl game. Following the conclusion of the season Virginia dismissed Al Groh as head coach and hired Mike London as his replacement.

Schedule

Personnel

References

Virginia
Virginia Cavaliers football seasons
Virginia Cavaliers football